Aar-Einrich is a Verbandsgemeinde ("collective municipality") in the Rhein-Lahn-Kreis, in Rhineland-Palatinate, Germany. Its seat is in Katzenelnbogen. It was formed on 1 July 2019 by the merger of the former Verbandsgemeinden Hahnstätten and Katzenelnbogen. It takes its name from the river Aar and the Einrich hills.

The Verbandsgemeinde Aar-Einrich consists of the following Ortsgemeinden ("local municipalities"):

 Allendorf
 Berghausen
 Berndroth
 Biebrich
 Bremberg
 Burgschwalbach
 Dörsdorf
 Ebertshausen
 Eisighofen
 Ergeshausen
 Flacht
 Gutenacker
 Hahnstätten
 Herold
 Kaltenholzhausen
 Katzenelnbogen
 Klingelbach
 Kördorf
 Lohrheim
 Mittelfischbach
 Mudershausen
 Netzbach
 Niederneisen
 Niedertiefenbach
 Oberfischbach
 Oberneisen
 Reckenroth
 Rettert
 Roth
 Schiesheim
 Schönborn

Verbandsgemeinde in Rhineland-Palatinate
Rhein-Lahn-Kreis